Robins v Secretary of State for Work and Pensions (2007) C-278/05 is a UK insolvency law and labour law case, concerning the protection of employees' salaries on their employer's insolvency.

Facts
Robins had been employed by a now insolvent company. He had a final salary pension. The company terminated the scheme and then told everyone there was not enough money to cover members’ benefits. They announced they would reduce benefits for members who had not yet started to receive pension payments. Robins claimed compensation from the Secretary of State for not providing the proper level of social protection under Directive 80/987 art 8. David Pannick QC was acting for the government.

The High Court asked the ECJ whether the member state needed to fund a scheme that had run out of money, and whether the UK had properly transposed the Directive. If not, should the UK incur liability?

Judgment
Judge Timmermans in the ECJ held that the member state did not require pension funds should be fully guaranteed, because the member state could oblige insurers to buy insurance.
However, Robins would gain benefits as low as 20% of entitlement, so the UK's scheme under the Pensions Act 2004 section 286 (establishing the Financial Assistance Scheme) did not ‘protect’ workers like Robins within the meaning of art 8, so the provision was improperly implemented. A Member State's liability was contingent on a finding of manifest and grave disregard by that state for the limits set on its discretion, Brasserie du Pecheur SA v Germany. To answer what that meant the national court would have to take into account the clarity and precision of art 8 with regard to the level of protection required, as well as the measure of discretion left to the national authorities.

See also

UK insolvency law
UK labour law

Notes

References

United Kingdom company case law
United Kingdom labour case law
Court of Justice of the European Union case law
2007 in case law
2007 in British law
Department for Work and Pensions
European Union labour case law